Keith Angus (born 5 April 1943) is a British long-distance runner. He competed in the marathon at the 1976 Summer Olympics.

References

1943 births
Living people
Athletes (track and field) at the 1976 Summer Olympics
British male long-distance runners
British male marathon runners
Olympic athletes of Great Britain
Sportspeople from Sheffield